La caverne, ou Le repentir (The Cavern, or Repentance) is an opera in three acts by French composer Jean-François Le Sueur. It was first performed at the Théâtre Feydeau, Paris, on 16 February 1793. The libretto, by Alphonse François "Paul" Palat-Dercy, is based on an episode from Lesage's novel Gil Blas. La caverne was the first opera by Le Sueur to be staged and it became one of the most popular works of the French Revolutionary era. The opera was notable for its innovative set design: the stage was divided horizontally, with the lower section representing the cavern of the title (a robbers' den) and the upper section showing a forest. Two levels of action were thus able to be shown simultaneously.

Roles

Synopsis
Gil Blas is captured by a robber band led by Rolando, who hold him in their den (the cavern of the title) along with the noblewoman Séraphine. Séraphine's husband comes looking for her disguised as a blind beggar but he too is caught by the robbers. Rolando repents and discovers he is Séraphine's brother. In the finale, Gil Blas, who has managed to escape, brings a rescue party, who shoot the robbers and free the prisoners.

References

Further reading
The Viking Opera Guide, ed. Amanda Holden (Viking, 1993)
Details of the set design

External links

Operas
French-language operas
Rescue operas
Operas by Jean-François Le Sueur
Operas based on novels
Opera world premieres at the Opéra-Comique